What Happened to Jones is a lost 1920 American silent comedy film directed by James Cruze and starring Bryant Washburn. It was based on the 1897 play What Happened to Jones by George Broadhurst. It was produced by Famous Players-Lasky and distributed by Paramount/Artcraft.

Cast
Bryant Washburn as Jimmie Jones
Margaret Loomis as Cissy Smith
J. Maurice Foster as Bobbie Brown
Frank Jonasson as Anthony Goodley
Lillian Leighton as Matilda Brown
Caroline Rankin as Alvina Smith
Richard Cummings as Green

References

External links

1920 films
American silent feature films
Lost American films
American films based on plays
Paramount Pictures films
Films directed by James Cruze
American black-and-white films
1920 comedy films
Silent American comedy films
1920s American films
1920s English-language films